Searsia sekhukhuniensis is a  medium-sized, deciduous tree, reaching a height of about 3 metres and a spread of 4 metres. It is endemic to Africa.

References

Plants described in 1993
sekhukhuniensis